The Emperors of Chocolate: Inside the Secret World of Hershey and Mars is a book by Joël Glenn Brenner published on December 22, 1998, by Random House, Inc. The book chronicles the stories of the history of Mars, Incorporated and The Hershey Company.

References

1998 non-fiction books
Books about companies
Random House books